Urspelt Castle is located in the little village of Urspelt some 3 km (2 mi) north-east of Clervaux in northern Luxembourg. Though the castle has a history going back at least three centuries, today's building dates from 1860. After comprehensive restoration work and additions, it recently opened as a hotel and meeting centre.

History

The origins of the castle go back more than 300 years when it was a small country property. Then in 1860, Amand Bouvier considerably expanded it. A new garden was laid out, now one of the area's most notable parks with its avenues and elm trees. When Bouvier died in 1900, he left a magnificent estate to his nephew Alfred Bouvier but he and his descendants failed to show much interest in the property. 

During the Second World War, the Germans used the castle as their headquarters for northern Luxembourg until they were forced to abandon it to the Americans during the Battle of the Bulge in the winter of 1944. It was a command post of Lieutenant Colonel Donald Paul, commanding officer of the 1st Battalion, 110th Infantry. 

After the war, the castle fell into disrepair and was used only as a hunting lodge. Towards the end of the 20th century, the deserted building was increasingly invaded by the surrounding undergrowth.

Finally, in August 2005, Freddy Lodomez bought the property and immediately embarked on comprehensive restoration work which continued for three years as the building was fitted out as a luxury hotel. An old well, apparently dating back to an 11th-century stronghold, was found and renovated. A second tower was added at the far end of the castle to house a lift.

The castle today

Since August 2008, the building has functioned as a hotel with restaurant and conference centre.

References

Clervaux
Castles in Luxembourg
Convention centres in Luxembourg
Hotels in Luxembourg
Castles in the Ardennes (Luxembourg)
Castles in the Eifel